Sergiu Cristian Popovici (born 23 March 1993) is a Romanian professional footballer who plays as a left back or a left winger for Sant Rafel.

Club career

On 19 March 2011, CS Flacăra Faget signed Sergiu Popovici from youth club LPS Banatul where he spent 7 years, before moving to Vaslui on 25 January 2012. Club leaders expressed excitement about his signing. On  17 August 2012, Sergiu Popovici, along with Răzvan Neagu and Valter Heil, was loaned out to Voința Sibiu, but returned to Vaslui a few months later when the club folded.

Popovici made his Liga I debut for FC Vaslui on 11 March 2013, in a 1–1 draw against Gloria Bistrița.

International career
Popovici made his first appearance for the Romanian U-19 against Italy U-19 in UEFA U-19 Championship qualifying, coming on as a substitute in the 87th minute. The score ended 2-1 for Romania.

References

External links

1993 births
Living people
People from Timiș County
Romanian footballers
Association football midfielders
Liga I players
FC Vaslui players
FC Botoșani players
CS Gaz Metan Mediaș players
FC Dinamo București players
FC Hermannstadt players
Liga II players
CSU Voința Sibiu players
LPS HD Clinceni players
SSU Politehnica Timișoara players
Romanian expatriate sportspeople in Spain
Real Murcia players
Segunda División B players